Buzo may refer to:

 Alex Buzo (1944–2006), Australian playwright and author
 Andrés Buzo, co-author of the Linde–Buzo–Gray algorithm
 Sergio Buzó (born 1977), Paraguayan artist
 Zihni Buzo (1912–2006), Albanian Australian civil engineer